Ramjohn is a name used primarily as a surname among Indo-Caribbean people of Muslim origin. It is related to the surname Ramzan.
It can refer to

Jean Ramjohn-Richards (born 1935), First Lady of Trinidad and Tobago.
Manny Ramjohn (1915–1998), Trinidadian athlete and Scout Leader.

Ram John Holder, Guyanese-British actor.